Lianovergi is a village in Platy municipal unit in eastern Imathia, Greece. Since the 2011 local government reform it is part of the municipality Alexandreia, of which it is a local community.

Transport
The village is served by a railway station with services to Thessaloniki, Platy, Edessa, and Alexandria.

Population

See also
List of settlements in Imathia

References

External links
 Lianovergi on the GTP Travel Pages

Populated places in Imathia